Azra Jafari is an Afghan politician and women rights advocate who became the first female mayor in Afghanistan appointed by President Hamid Karzai in December 2008. She became the mayor of Nili, a town in Daykundi Province of Afghanistan. She belongs to the Hazara ethnic group.

Personal life
Jafari completed her high school in Iran while living there as a refugee and continued her education at Midwifery school in Kabul 2005. After the removal of the Taliban in late 2001 and the establishment of the new western-backed Karzai administration, she returned and participated in the Emergency Loya Jirga in Kabul.

Career
Azra Jafari was editor-in-chief of Afghan social and cultural magazine Farhang in 1998. Later, she established an elementary school for Afghan refugees in Iran while she was working as Officer in Charge in Refugees' Cultural Center. In 2001, Jafari joined Emergency Loya Jirga in Kabul. In December 2008, she was appointed as the first and only female mayor in Afghanistan. She was appointed as the mayor of Nili town

Publications
Jafari has been involved in the writing of two books since returning to Afghanistan. She contributed to The Making of the New Constitution of Afghanistan, which is about the political system and processes in Afghanistan and was published in 2003. She wrote I am a Working Woman, which talks about employment law and the rights of Afghan women in the labour market, and was published in 2008.

Awards
Azra Jafari has been awarded the Meeto Memorial Award at the Pakistan National Council of the Arts for her work and commitment to social development.

See also
 List of Hazara people

References

External links
Women's rights worsened Reuters
A Talk with the first female mayor DW-World
First female mayor in Afghanistan Zamaaneh
First female mayor has been appointed BBC Persian
 Interview with the first female mayor
Azra Jafari among eight women around the world 
A letter to Donald Trump "Dear Donald Trump: Letters from Afghanistan"

Living people
1978 births
21st-century Afghan women politicians
21st-century Afghan politicians
Hazara politicians
Women mayors of places in Afghanistan